Mentzelia gracilenta, known by the common names blazing star, grass blazingstar, and slender blazing star,  is a species of flowering plant in the family Loasaceae.

Distribution
The plant is endemic to California, where it is known only from the Southern California Coast Ranges and Western Transverse Ranges of Central and Southern California. Much of its range is within the Los Padres National Forest.

It grows in grasslands, oak woodlands, and rugged mountain habitats including serpentine soils and rocky slopes. It intergrades with Mentzelia ravenii, Mentzelia montana, and Mentzelia veatchiana.

Description
Mentzelia gracilenta is an annual herb producing an erect greenish stem sometimes exceeding  in maximum height. The leaves are divided deeply into comblike lobes, the longest in the basal rosette 13 centimeters long and those higher on the stem reduced in size.

The inflorescence is a cluster of flowers each with five shiny yellow petals dotted with red at the bases, measuring roughly one to two centimeters long. The fruit is a narrow, curving utricle containing many tiny, angular seeds.

See also
California montane chaparral and woodlands
California oak woodlands

References

External links

Jepson Manual Treatment: Mentzelia gracilenta
Calflora Database: Mentzelia gracilenta (blazing star, grass blazingstar, slender blazing star)
Mentzelia gracilenta — U.C. Photo gallery

gracilenta
Endemic flora of California
Natural history of the California chaparral and woodlands
Natural history of the California Coast Ranges
Natural history of the Santa Monica Mountains
Natural history of the Transverse Ranges
~
Flora without expected TNC conservation status